Manuela Anwander (born January 9, 1992) is a German ice hockey forward.

International career
Anwander was selected for the Germany women's national ice hockey team in the 2014 Winter Olympics. She played in all five games, scoring one goal and adding one assists.

Anwander also played for Germany in the qualifying event for the 2014 Winter Olympics. She played in all three games, scoring one goal and adding two assists. She also appeared in the 2010 qualifying

As of 2014, Anwander has also appeared for Germany at four IIHF Women's World Championships. Her first appearance came in 2008.

Anwander made three appearances for the Germany women's national under-18 ice hockey team, at the IIHF World Women's U18 Championships, with the first in 2008.

Career statistics

International career
Through 2013–14 season

References

External links

Sports-Reference Profile

1992 births
Living people
German women's ice hockey forwards
Ice hockey players at the 2014 Winter Olympics
Olympic ice hockey players of Germany
People from Munich (district)
Sportspeople from Upper Bavaria
21st-century German women